Kazbek Kubadiyevich Zankishiev (born 23 May 1992) is a Russian judoka. He is the 2017 European bronze medalist in the –100 kg division.

References

External links
 

1992 births
Russian male judoka
Living people
Judoka at the 2019 European Games
European Games medalists in judo
European Games gold medalists for Russia